The Hino S'elega (kana:日野・セレガ) is a heavy-duty passenger bus produced by Hino Motors through the J-Bus joint-venture. They have primarily served as a tourist coach since 1990.

Hino tourist coach
RX10 (1960)
RA100/120 (1963)
RA900 (1969)
RV100 (1969)
RV730/750/530/550 (1972)
RV731/741/761/531/541/561 (1978)
K-RV732/742/762/531/541/561 (1980)
P-RY638AA (1985)

RS/RU-series
RS120/140/320/360 (1977)
K-RS121/141/161/320/340/360 (1980)
K-RU63/60 (1982)
P-RU63/60 (1984)

First generation(1990-2005)

S'elega(1990-2000)
U-RU1/2/3/4 (1990)
Wheelbase long (6.5 meter: RU1/2) / short(6.2 meter: RU3/4)
KC-RU1/2/3/4 (1995)
Wheelbase short (6.2 meter)
Jake brake(named Hino Engine Retarder) equipped: GD/GJ(standard) FD/FS(option)
Hydraulic retarder: option

S'elega R(2000-2005)
KL-RU1/4(2000)
Magnetic retarder equipped(GD/GJ)

S'elega R Hybrid(2004-2006)
VM-RU2PPFR(2004)

Engine 
Standard model: V-8 OHV Diesel
F17E - Max output: 
F20C - Max output:  (U-RU) or (KC-RU)
F21C - Max output:  or 
F17D (Turbocharged) - Max output:  (for S'elega R KL-RU1FSEA)
Hybrid model: turbocharged straight-6 OHV Diesel
P11C - Max output:

Second generation(2005-)

The Hino S'elega second generation is also sold as the Isuzu Gala.
ADG-RU1E/8J (2005)
PKG-RU1E/BDG-RU8J (2006)
BJG-RU1ASAR (2008: Hybrid model)

Engine 
All models are turbocharged straight-6 OHC Diesel.
J08E (7.7 Liter, Max output: , for RU8J: 9m length model)
A09C-1M (8.8 Liter, Max output: , for RU1A: hybrid model only)

Model lineup
First generation
GD 12m
GJ 12m
GT 12m
FD 11.5m/12m
FS 12m
FM 11m/11.5m
FC 9m
Second generation
SHD (Super hi-decker) 12m
HD (Hi-decker) 12m
HD-S (Hi-decker short) 9m

References

External links

Hino S'elega Homepage

Selega
Buses
Coaches (bus)
Hybrid electric buses
Buses of Japan
Full-size buses
Vehicles introduced in 1990